Nicolas-Jean Lefroid de Méreaux (1745–1797) was a French composer born in Paris.

According to music critic François-Joseph Fétis, Méreaux studied music under French and Italian teachers before becoming the organist of the Church of Saint-Jacques-du-Haut-Pas. He wrote several motets for the church and had his oratorio Esther performed at the Concert Spirituel in 1775. His first published work was the cantata Aline, reine de Golconde in 1767. He went on to compose several operas.

His son, Joseph-Nicolas Lefroid de Méreaux (1767–1838), was also a composer, mostly of piano music. His grandson was Amédée Méreaux.

Operas

References

Sources
 Félix Clément and Pierre Larousse Dictionnaire des Opéras, Paris, 1881. Available online here . 
 Benoît Dratwicki, "Foreigners at the Académie Royale de Musique" in Antonio Sacchini, Renaud, Madrid, Ediciones Singulares, 2013 (book accompanying the complete recording conducted by Christophe Rousset). 
Fétis, Biographie universelle des musiciens, Brussels, 1840 edition, Volume 6

External links
 

French male classical composers
French opera composers
Male opera composers
1745 births
1797 deaths
18th-century classical composers
18th-century French composers
18th-century French male musicians